The José Limón National Contemporary Dance Award is a Mexican modern and contemporary dance award established in 1988 and named in honor of the dancer and choreographer José Limón. Due to its age and significance, it is considered the country's most important dance award.

History and description
The José Limón National Dance Award was established in 1988 to recognize the most outstanding figures of modern and contemporary Mexican or foreign dance. It was named in honor of José Limón, a dancer and choreographer born in Culiacán, Sinaloa, considered a groundbreaking innovator in the history of contemporary dance, and one who elevated the male figure in the field. At its 30th edition, held in 2010, the award's name was changed to the José Limón National Contemporary Dance Award.

The distinction, considered the country's most important in the medium, is awarded each year during the José Limón International Contemporary Dance Festival, to people or institutions whose work in modern and contemporary dance constitutes a significant contribution to this art in Mexico.

To commemorate the 100th anniversary of Limón's birth, six awards were presented in 2008. In addition, a person who was not a dancer or choreographer was recognized for the first time – academic  received an award as one of the most outstanding dance researchers and historians in Mexico.

Recipients

References

1988 establishments in Mexico
Awards established in 1988
Contemporary dance
Dance awards
Dance in Mexico
Mexican awards
Modern dance